Fatumah Ahmed is a major general in the Kenya Air Force.  She was originally a member of the women-only Kenyan Women Service Corps, transferring to the air force when the unit was absorbed into the three armed services in 1999.  Ahmed has a degree from the Institute of Diplomacy and International Studies and has served mainly in human resources roles.  She is Kenya's first female brigadier.

Career 
Fatumah Ahmed born in 1965 joined the Kenyan Army "by accident".  Upon completing secondary school in 1983 she had to return to her home town in order to claim an identification card.  The military happened to be carrying out a recruitment campaign at a stadium near to the offices of the ID services and she made enquiries about joining.  She entered the Kenya Military Academy as an officer cadet in 1984 and upon graduating was commissioned a second lieutenant in the Kenyan Women Service Corps.  From 1985 she served alongside the Kenyan Air Force, mainly in human resources.

Ahmed has a degree from the  National Defence College and the Institute of Diplomacy and International Studies and a diploma in management from Strathmore University.  She transferred to the Kenyan Air Force when the Women Service Corps was dissolved in 1999 and its personnel integrated into the remaining Kenyan armed forces.  This also removed the limitation for members of the Women Service Corps on not marrying or getting pregnant; Ahmed went on to have three children.  She served as deputy commander of a battalion and later as head of personnel at the Kenyan Air Force headquarters.  Ahmed was promoted to the rank of brigadier on 10 August 2015 and was also appointed  managing director of the Defense Forces Medical Insurance Scheme.  She was the first female brigadier in Kenya.

Ahmed was promoted to major general on 13 July 2018, becoming the first woman to hold that rank in the Kenya Defence forces.
She is in a good position to succeed the current Chief of Defence Forces Gen. Kibochi upon his retirement soon.

References 

Living people
Kenyan women
Kenyan military personnel
Air force personnel
Strathmore University alumni
Year of birth missing (living people)